Royal Roads University (also referred to as RRU or Royal Roads) is a public university with its main campus in Colwood, British Columbia. It is located at Hatley Park National Historic Site on Vancouver Island. Following the decommissioning of Royal Roads Military College in 1995, the government of British Columbia created Royal Roads University as a public university with an applied and professional degree-granting focus. The university considers alumni of RRMC to be part of its broader alumni community.

History

The university's main building, Hatley Castle, was completed in 1908 for coal and rail baron James Dunsmuir, who was Premier of British Columbia and then Lieutenant Governor during the first decade of the 1900s. At the outbreak of World War II, plans were made for King George VI, his wife Queen Elizabeth, and their two daughters, Princesses Elizabeth and Margaret, to reside in Canada. Hatley Castle was purchased by the federal government in 1940 for use as the King's royal palace, but it was decided that having the Royal Family leave the UK at a time of war would be too big a blow to morale, and the family stayed in London.

After the death of Dunsmuir and then his widow Laura, the family sold the estate to the federal government in 1940 to be used by the military.  (named after an offshore naval anchorage) was commissioned in December 1940 to train reserve officers for service in World War II. The institution had several names before it eventually became Royal Roads Military College in 1968 (achieving full degree-granting status in 1975).

Petty Officer First Class Gabby R. Bruner, Royal Roads bandmaster from 1979–85, composed `Hatley Park` as the official quick march for RRMC and `Dunsmuir Castle` for the visit of Queen Elizabeth II to Royal Roads in 1983.

When the military college was decommissioned, many of the academic staff stayed on. The historic buildings of the military college, and the extensive gardens, which were part of the estate of the Dunsmuirs, continue to be a centrepiece of the campus. Hatley Castle, the former residence of the Dunsmuir family, houses a small Canadian Military museum.

In June 1995, Royal Roads University became a public degree-granting university. A replica of Horatio Nelson's quote, "Duty is the great business of a sea officer: All private considerations must give way to it however painful it is", which hung over the entrance to the Grant Building, was returned to Royal Roads University's campus for Homecoming in 2011.

Royal Roads University Museum

The museum is located in the lower level of Hatley Castle, on the campus of the Royal Roads University and former campus of the Royal Roads Military College. The museum's mandate is to collect, conserve, research and display material relating to the history of the Royal Roads Military College, its former cadets and its site.

The Royal Roads Military College Museum is a member of the Canadian Museums Association and the Organization of Military Museums of Canada Inc. The Royal Roads Museum is an accredited museum within the Canadian Forces Museum System. The museum has formed a cooperating association of friends of the
museum to assist with projects. The museum is not open to the public.

Academics
Royal Roads University offers applied and professional programs at the undergraduate, graduate and doctoral levels, focusing on graduate level career development. The programs are primarily offered in a cohort model as a blended format, combining periodic on campus residencies for face to face intensive sessions with on line courses. This format is designed to favour working professionals, who may complete the programs at a distance while maintaining their career. The University offers three formats: i) on-site with 100% face to face learning, ii) blended, with part of the program taught in a face to face residency and the balance on line; and iii) completely on-line. Residency based programs range from one to three weeks, and are often held on-campus, but select programs host their residencies in unique locations around the world. Mature students are welcome, and credits are available for prior experience in the subject area. The university also offers some full-time accelerated on-campus undergraduate programs.

Student government
The Royal Roads University Student Association represents undergraduate students at the university.

Campus and grounds
The campus and surrounding grounds of Royal Roads University are situated at Hatley Park National Historic Site. Royal Roads leases the land from the Department of National Defence for $1 per year and assumes all stewardship responsibilities related to the site including the cost of site management, operations, the protection, preservation and restoration of heritage assets, which include all buildings on the site as well as many heritage gardens and educating the public about the site's historic and natural attributes.

Other buildings

The grounds, a mix of landscaped gardens and natural woodland, still go by the name of Hatley Park that the Dunsmuir family gave their estate (it is not a designated park). Hatley Castle and its surroundings have made appearances in numerous movies and TV series programs such as Smallville where it serves as the Luthor Mansion, and the second and third X-Men films where the university is transformed into Professor Xavier's School for Gifted Youngsters.

Visitors to the  Hatley Park can tour the extensive walking trails, as well as the Hatley Castle museum. The museum is free to enter, and contains historic, local memorabilia as well as a gift shop. Tours of the castle itself are available (schedule is seasonal) and access to the heritage gardens (approx 20 acres) have a visitor fee that helps offset the cost of preserving the site.

In a visit to the university in August 2009, Prime Minister Stephen Harper stated: "There is surely no more beautiful campus in Canada than Lord Dunsmuir’s magnificent castle and the majestic forest and gardens of the Hatley Park National Historic Site. But beneath the Edwardian grandeur of Royal Roads lies a cutting-edge modern university".

During the life of the college, the HMCS Royal Roads Bell was displayed in the porte-cochere of Hatley Castle. After the closing of Royal Roads Military College, the HMCS Royal Roads Bell was kept in the Museum at CFB Esquimalt. It was officially repatriated on 10 Sep 2010 during the Royal Roads University 2010 Homecoming.

General ranking
Based on the 2011 National Survey of Student Engagement (NSSE), Royal Roads University was ranked 1st public institution for an active and collaborative learning experience and for level of academic challenge

In 2008 The Globe and Mails Canadian University Report gave Royal Roads grades in particular categories along with 55 other universities. The grades are based on the Globe and Mail student satisfaction survey. Royal Roads was one of the 14 universities in the under 4000 students assessment pool and received a grade of B-:

Business school ranking
The BCom and MBA programs at Royal Roads were ranked by Corporate Knights Magazine in July 2007. The Royal Roads BCom program placed 28th out of the 47 BCom programs in Canada. The MBA placed 20th out of 35 MBA programs. In 2008 Corporate Knights Magazine dropped the Bcom ranking from 28th to 36th out of 47 Bcom programs in the country. The MBA program dropped from 20th to 31st with the assessment pool for the ranking growing from 35 to 38 MBA programs. In 2009 Corporate Knights Magazine ranked the Bcom 25th overall out of 47 universities and 4th in the Small Sized Business School category. The MBA ranked 22 overall out of 35 universities and 4th in the Small Sized Business School category. Corporate Knights magazine bases its rankings on "the integration of environmental and social issues into university and college programmes."

Notable alumni

Vice-Admiral Jean-Yves Forcier, Commander Maritime Forces Pacific, Commander Canada Command, currently Head of Program for the Master of Arts in Disaster and Emergency Management at Royal Roads.
Kellie Garrett, Executive Coach, Speaker and Consultant; former Senior Vice President of Farm Credit Canada; named Fellow of International Association of Business Communicators (2015); one of Canada’s 25 Women of Influence (2010); and 100 Most Powerful Woman by the Women’s Executive Network (2007).
David Hamilton (deputy minister), Deputy Minister of the Legislative Assembly and Chief Electoral Officer of the Northwest Territories.
Jim Kyte, former NHL player and Chair of Business School Algonquin College
Hugh MacDonald (executive), former VP Strategic Alliance Management at CIBC, currently owner of HR Macdonald Training and Development, Inc.
Peter Robinson (CEO), CEO of the David Suzuki Foundation and former CEO of Mountain Equipment Co-op.
Doug Stables, President of Bluewater Technologies Corporation.
Jennifer Walinga, Olympic Gold Medalist and World Champion in rowing.
Capt. Kelly Williams (director of maritime strategy), Director of Maritime Strategy for the Department of National Defense.
 Col. Chris Hadfield, Canadian Astronaut
Senator Vernon White, Canadian Senator

Media appearances
The Royal Roads campus has been used as a location for filming TV shows and movies, including The Changeling, the X-Men movies X2 and X-Men: The Last Stand, Smallville, Arrow, Deadpool, and The Professor.

Arms

See also
Canadian Centre for Environmental Education (CCEE)
Education in Canada
Higher education in British Columbia
List of universities in British Columbia
Royal Roads Military College

Books

References

External links

Royal Roads University
Asian MBA Program
Hatley Castle
AUCC – Royal Roads University
 Royal Roads University Bangladesh Campus

 
Universities in British Columbia
Educational institutions established in 1995
1995 establishments in British Columbia
Distance education institutions based in Canada